Churchville is a preserved suburban hamlet in the south-west corner of Brampton, Ontario, Canada. It is designated as a heritage community under the Ontario Heritage Act.

History
Churchville was founded in 1815 by Amaziah Church (1766-1831), who built a gristmill on the Credit River in what was then Toronto Township, York County (Peel County was created from York County in 1851). This small area surrounding the mill on the floodplain of the river valley was where the original settlement was focused.

Over the course of its history, the village grew to include homes, a slaughterhouse, a tannery, a school house, a wooden sidewalk, several churches and small hotels and a cemetery. Many of these structures no longer exist, although some houses have survived from Churchville's early period, and are designated heritage houses.

Churchville, along with the northern extremities of Mississauga (which Toronto Township was restructured into in 1967), were amalgamated into the enlarged City of Brampton on 1 January 1974 as part of the restructuring of Peel County into the Regional Municipality of Peel.

Notes

External links
 
 

Neighbourhoods in Brampton